JN-International Medical Corporation (JNIMC) is a U.S.-based biopharmaceutical corporation which since 1998 has been focused on developing vaccines and diagnostics for infectious disease for developing countries. This private corporation (formerly known as Jeeri Neotech International, Inc) was founded in 1998 by Dr. Jeeri R. Reddy with the help of Dr. Kelly F. Lechtenberg in a small rural town, Oakland, Nebraska. From there it grew and expanded until in the year 2000 the corporation moved to Omaha, Nebraska.

JNIMC partners with Global Health Organizations such as the Clinton Global Initiative, the Global Business Coalition, New York, President's Malaria Initiative (PMI), The Global Health Council, NGOs, local governments and communities in developing countries to address the health issues related to HIV AIDS, malaria, tuberculosis, and bacterial meningitis that affect the underserved communities in West Africa, South East Asia, and Latin America.

History
Early in its existence JNIMC developed rapid and western blot diagnostic test kits for Malaria TB and HIV. JNI was the first company to screen about 2 million pregnant women for the presence of HIV in South East Asia from 1999 – 2002. This resulted in many HIV-free births because the hospitals were able to treat the HIV positive pregnant women with Antiretroviral drugs. A rapid Tuberculosis test was developed by the company and demonstrated its diagnostic potential by screening 400 TB positive and negative serum samples from various hospitals in India. The results showed that the combination of Mycobacterium tuberculosis antigens improved the diagnostic specificity and sensitivity of the tests. The diagnostic products of the company have been used in more than 30 countries for screening infectious diseases.

Vaccine facilities
JNIMC facility was designed for manufacture, research and development of human vaccines in compliance with FDA compliant cGMP (Current Good Manufacturing Practices) and European Union Good Manufacturing Practice standards. The facility has fermentation, formulation, vial, freeze drying bacterial facilities classified as Biosafety Level 2 (CDC-NIH BL2-LS) and ISO 9001. The facility includes both the upstream and downstream operations when the fermentation process is scaled up for bacterial polysaccharide product development. The facilities were designed for manufacture of vaccines in compliance with cGMP and European standards. The facility has fermentation, formulations and lyophilization and handling of bacterial polysaccharide products. Utilities include Water-For-Injection Grade Water (WFI) system, oil-free compressed air system (USP), clean steam system, process chilled system and Clean-in-Place systems. Processes include; seed bank, media preparation, fermentation, cell harvest, centrifugation and purification including ultra filtration. The facility operates with SCADA (supervisory control and data acquisition) generally refers to industrial control systems (ICS). JNIMC's cGMP vaccine facility spans 32,000 ft² and will include a 10,000 ft² fully automated unit. The facility has a targeted production of 10 million doses of vaccine annually.

Acquisition and Bankruptcy
In January 2009, JNIMC acquired Biocor vaccine manufacture facilities, a subsidiary of Pfizer Inc. in Omaha. The facilities consist of three buildings approximately 71,749 sq. ft., and were designed for manufacture of vaccines in compliance with European Community, U.S. Food and Drug Administration and U.S. Department of Agriculture standards. JNIMC will keep the Starwood containment facility for research and development of vaccines for clinical studies and moved its vaccine operations to the newly acquired Maple street facilities in February 2009. The added capacity of the plant allowed increased production of the firm's meningitis vaccine. The investment in the new facility plant is the largest capital investment in Omaha to date for the company, and will result in production, formulation, filling and packaging capacity facilities, which are intended to help significantly reduce time to market for the firm's Meningococcal meningitis serotypes A, C, Y & W-135 vaccine production capacity to meet the demand of sub-Saharan Africa.

JN Medical Corporation of Omaha, NB has filed a Petition for Relief pursuant to Ch. 11 of the Bankruptcy Code in the United States Bankruptcy Court for the District of Nebraska, case no. 17-80174-TLS. This occurred due to lack of funds from the shareholders, through they supported the company until 2015.

Clinical Trials
Meningococcal meningitis diphtheria conjugate vaccine
 NmVac4-A/C/Y/W-135 - DT Meningococcal meningitis diphtheria conjugate vaccine for the prevention of Meningococcal meningitis serogroups A, C, Y and W-135 Diphtheria conjugate vaccine. Phase-1 and 2 human clinical trials completed in California and Maryland with IND approval from Food and Drug Administration (FDA) and National Institutes of Health.

Research and development

Patents and publications
JNIMC patents and publishes Journal articles of its research and technologies in the field of human infectious diseases and neurological disorders Patents by Inventor Jeeri R Reddy

References

External links

Biotechnology companies of the United States
Companies based in Omaha, Nebraska
Multinational companies headquartered in the United States
Vaccine producers